Carbohydrate sulfotransferase 14 is an enzyme that in humans is encoded by the CHST14 gene.

Gene
CHST14, a protein-coding gene, encodes for the enzyme carbohydrate sulfotransferase 14 (CHST14)/ dermatan 4-O-sulfotransferase (D4ST1).

In humans, CHST14 is positioned on the long arm (q) of chromosome 15 at position 15.1, from base pair 40,470,961 to base pair 40,474,571. The CHST14 gene is 3,611 bases long, composed of 376 amino acids, and has a molecular mass of 42997 Da.

Ontology
CHST14 is implicated in fetal development of connective tissues throughout multiple organ systems. It is also implicated in regulation of proliferation and neurogenesis of neural precursor cells. It has been linked to inhibition of peripheral nerve regeneration in adults.

Function 
Dermatan 4-O-sulfotransferase enzymatically transfers an active sulfate to position 4 of N-acetyl-D-galactosamine residues of dermatan sulfate, stabilizing this glycosaminoglycan. Dermatan sulfate is essential to extracellular matrix formation and is found in extensively in skin, tendons, cartilage, and the aortic wall. Mutation of CHST14 results in a deficiency of dermatan sulfate, which disrupts glycosaminoglycan constituents in fibroblasts and impairs collagen fibril linkage within collagen bundles.

Clinical significance
Mutation of CHST14 is associated with the Musculocontractural type of Ehlers–Danlos syndromes,  recently specified as CHST14/D4ST1 deficiency. Previously, this condition has been independently referred to as adducted thumb-clubfoot syndrome, Ehlers-Danlos syndrome, Kosho type, musculocontractural Ehlers-Danlos syndrome, and Ehlers-Danlos type VIB. Currently, 40 patients from 27 families have been diagnosed with this autosomal recessive mutation. CHST14/D4ST1 deficiency is the first identified human disease that directly impacts dermatan sulfate production." Hallmark features include congenital malformations (extensive craniofacial defects, skin elasticity, joint laxity, multiple contractures) combined with progressive fragility of affected structures, with increased incidence of bruising, recurrent joint dislocations, pneumothorax, spinal degeneration, and other deformities.

References

External links

Further reading